Marek Poštulka (born 21 June 1970) is a Czech former football player. He played international football for Czechoslovakia and the Czech Republic. Poštulka scored two goals in two games for Representation of Czechs and Slovaks (RCS, a temporary title after the dissolution of Czechoslovakia) and one goal in two appearances for the Czech Republic. He played more than 100 games for Baník Ostrava.

Poštulka seriously injured his knee for the third time in March 1996 while playing for the Czech Republic against Turkey. The injury caused him to miss out on selection for UEFA Euro 1996. He underwent a total of ten operations on his knees but they eventually brought about his premature retirement from football.

After his football career, Poštulka became a physiotherapist in Petřvald (Karviná District).

References

External links
 

1970 births
Living people
Czechoslovak footballers
Czech footballers
Czechoslovakia international footballers
Czech Republic international footballers
Czech First League players
FC Baník Ostrava players
FK Viktoria Žižkov players
Association football forwards
People from Bohumín
Sportspeople from the Moravian-Silesian Region